The World Senior Citizen's Day is celebrated on 21 August each year.

The celebration took place for the first time in 1991. The day is intended to increase awareness of the factors and issues that affect older adults, such as health deterioration and elder abuse. It is also a day to recognize and acknowledge the contributions of older people to society.

History 
The history of the World Senior Citizen's Day dates back to 1988. It was officially founded by the former President of the United States of America, Ronald Reagan. He had signed on August 19, 1988, the promulgation of 5847, which appeared on 21 August as National Day of the Third Age. Ronald Reagan was the first to announce the first National Day of the Third Age.

Purpose 
World Senior Citizen's Day is an opportunity to celebrate and appreciate senior citizens for their services, accomplishments, and dedication they have given in their lives.

See also 
 International Day of Older Persons
 Elderly care
 International observances

References

August observances
Senior Citizen Day, World
Old age